Rasmus Nøhr (born 7 March 1972 in Copenhagen) is a Danish musician, composer, and guitarist who had a breakthrough in Denmark with the song Det glade pizzabud, a duet with Ida Corr. In 2004 he released his debut album called Rasmus Nøhr. In 2006 he released his second album - "Lykkelig Smutning". He has now released his third album called "I stedet for en tatovering" (Instead of a tattoo)

Mig og dig (Me and you) was a Danish documentary / docu-comedy by Max Kestner in 2006, about the difficult road to stardom and about the friendship between Rasmus Nøhr and Morten Holm. The film also features Gustav (Gus) Hansen, Mik Christensen and Nick Foss. The same year he was featured in another TV documentary Gennembrud in episode entitled "Ataf Khawaja & Rasmus Nøhr". On 27 July 2011, he appeared as principal feature in the Danish comedy series Vild med comedy. The show also included participation from Simon Talbot as a comedy coach, Maria Erwolter, Thomas Evers Poulsen, Jeppe Bruun Wahlstrøm.

In 2012 Rasmus Nøhr created the festival called Danmark Dejligst. He wanted to get around the country and play his music in smaller places and cities, that normally wouldn't have the opportunity to host music events. So he started playing for free in people's backyards all across the country, and the support from the local communities was huge. The year after - in 2013 - he toured the country again with the Danmark Dejligst concept, now adding more locations. In 2015 the festival grew to 28 events.

Now - in 2016 - Danmark Dejligst will consist of around 30 events  - from Skagen to Rødby. The local events will have a lot of live music. Rasmus Nøhr and other famous musicians will play alongside upcoming and local bands. There will also be different activities arranged by the local communities.

During the COVID-19 pandemic, Nøhr drew controversy for spreading misinformation regarding COVID-19 and its vaccines.

Discography

Studio albums

Live albums

Singles

Filmography
Documentaries
2006: Mig og dig - documentary - as himself 
2006: Gennembrud in episode "Ataf Khawaja & Rasmus Nøhr" - as himself
Television
2011: Vild med comedy - episode "Rasmus Nøhr" as himself

References

External links
 Rasmus Nøhr Official homepage

Danish composers
Male composers
Danish guitarists
1972 births
Living people
21st-century guitarists
21st-century male musicians
COVID-19 conspiracy theorists